Atlanta High School may refer to:

Atlanta High School (Louisiana), Atlanta, Louisiana 
Atlanta High School (Missouri), Atlanta, Missouri 
Atlanta High School (Texas), Atlanta, Texas